The Battle of Jammu was fought between the Sikhs under the command of Banda Singh Bahadur against the Mughal forces near the hills of Jammu on January 22, 1712. The Mughals were able to achieve victory against the Sikhs.

Background 
After the killing of Mughal commanders, Shamas Khan and Bayazid Khan near Bahranpur, the Sikhs under Banda singh Bahadur began occupying the towns of Pasrur and Aurangabad. The Mughal Forces under the leadership of Muhammad Amin Khan Turani were able to defeat the Sikhs near Pasrur and pursued the Sikhs into the hills of Jammu.

Battle 
Muhammad Amin Khan soon joined both Rustamdil Khan and Aghar Khan and combined there forces and attempted to incircle the Sikhs. The Sikhs however were able to cut through the Mughal Lines and the Sikhs were able to escape. Rustamdil Khan then proceeded to commit atrocities on the villages of Parol and Kathua and sold its men and women in the slave markets of Lahore due to him suspecting the villagers to be Sikhs. Muhammad Amin advanced upon Jammu and was able to kill 500 Sikhs. Banda Singh however was able to escape.

Aftermath 
Banda Singh was able to escape from the hills of Jammu and was successful in retaking both Sadhaura and Lohgarh. After the death of Bahadur Shah I, a civil war would ensue between Bahadur Shah's successors in March of 1712.Jahandar Shah would succeed Bahadur Shah as the new Mughal emperor and sent Muhammad Amin Khan to retake Sadhaura from the Sikhs. Muhammad Amin Khan however failed in retaking Sadhaura and was soon recalled by Jahandar Shah to join him on his expedition in Agra against Jahandar Shah's nephew, Farrukhsiyar.

See also 

 Battle of Lohgarh

References 

Jammu
Jammu
1712 in Asia
Jammu
Jammu